Risoba diehli is a species of moth of the family Nolidae. It is found in Sumatra.

References
Kobes,2006. Risobinae of Sumatra (Lepidoptera, Noctuidae, Risobinae). Heterocera Sumatrana Vol.12, fasc. 6

Nolidae
Moths of Sumatra
Moths described in 2006